Marianne Dubois (born 17 December 1957) is a French Republican politician who has represented Loiret's 5th constituency in the National Assembly from 2009 to 2022.

Political career
In parliament, Dubois served on the Defence Committee. In this capacity, she was the parliament's co-rapporteur (alongside Émilie Guerel) on the introduction of the General National Service (SNU) in 2018. In addition to her committee assignments, she was a member of the French-Bolivian Parliamentary Friendship Group.

Dubois did not stand down at the 2022 French legislative election.

Political positions
In the Republicans’ 2016 presidential primaries, Dubois endorsed François Fillon as the party's candidate for the office of President of France. In the party's 2017 leadership election, she later supported Laurent Wauquiez. Ahead of the 2022 presidential elections, she publicly declared her support for Michel Barnier as the Republicans’ candidate.

References

External links 
 Official Website

Living people
1957 births
People from Corbeil-Essonnes
People from Loiret
The Republicans (France) politicians
Politicians from Centre-Val de Loire
21st-century French women politicians
Women members of the National Assembly (France)
Deputies of the 13th National Assembly of the French Fifth Republic
Deputies of the 14th National Assembly of the French Fifth Republic
Deputies of the 15th National Assembly of the French Fifth Republic
Members of Parliament for Loiret